The Baldy Mining District is one of the largest primarily gold producing districts in New Mexico. Also sometimes known as the Elizabethtown Mining District, it encompasses Baldy Mountain (Colfax County, New Mexico). There is no longer any large scale mining. Most of the land is now owned by the Boy Scouts of America as a part of Philmont Scout Ranch. The Baldy Mining District is approximately 18,247 Acres.

History 
Gold was originally found on Baldy Mountain in 1866. Early in the year of 1866, Native Americans (either from the Ute or Jicarilla Apache tribes) found a large deposit of copper bearing ores. They traded these ores with soldiers at Fort Union. With the Civil war over, the soldiers decided that they could mine the copper for profit. One of the Native Americans showed a soldier where they had found the copper, on Baldy Mountain, and the soldier staked a claim. Known as the "Mystic Lode" or just the "Copper Mine", this was the first mine in the Baldy Mining District. In October of that same year, three soldiers from Fort Union, Larry Bronson, Pete Kinsinger, and a soldier called Kelley were sent to the mine to continue work. When the men arrived at the mine, Bronson and Kinsinger cooked a meal while Kelley decided to pan for gold. Kelley found gold in the gravel, showed the others, and they all began searching for more. They spent a few days scouring the slopes for gold. They determined that although this gold was worth pursuing, winter was approaching and mining operations could not continue. They left the mountain with plans to keep the gold a secret and return in the spring. The secret spread within weeks and the gold rush on Baldy had started.

Towns

Elizabethtown 
Elizabethtown, also known as E-Town, was the first mining town established in the Baldy Mining District. Elizabethtown was the first incorporated town in New Mexico and once held the Colfax County seat. Growing and shrinking along with the booms and busts of the Baldy Mining District, the town was mostly abandoned by 1917.

Baldy Town 
Baldy Town was a small mining town located on the side of Baldy Mountain.

Mines 
The mines in the Baldy Mining District produce mainly gold, silver, and copper.

References

External links 

 USGS Online Data
 High quality paper on the Baldy Mining District. Boom and Bust on Baldy Mountain

Geography of Colfax County, New Mexico
Gold mines in the United States
Mining in New Mexico
Mining districts in North America